The Ik is a 1975 play by Colin Higgins and Denis Cannan adapted from the 1972 book by Colin Turnbull about the Ik people titled The Mountain People.

It was devised with director Peter Brook.

External links
  (1976 Royal Shakespeare Company production)
  (1980 Australian production)

1975 plays
Plays set in Uganda
Ugandan culture
Plays based on books